Kissel is a Slavic cold-solidified dish with the consistency of a thick gel, popular as a dessert and as a drink. Kissel may also refer to:

People
 Andrew Kissel (1959–2006), murdered American real estate developer
 Brett Kissel (born 1990), Canadian country singer
 Hans Kissel (1897–1975), Generalmajor in the Wehrmacht during World War II
 John Kissel (New York politician) (1864–1938), New York State Senate
 John Kissel (Connecticut politician) (born 1959), Connecticut State Senate
 Michael Case Kissel (1948–2009) was an American music producer and engineer
 Robert Kissel (1963–2003), murdered investment banker

Other
 Kissel Motor Car Company, American automobile and truck manufacturing company active from 1906 to 1942
 21450 Kissel, a minor planet named for Intel Science Talent Search mentor Stacy Kissel
 Kissel Hill, Pennsylvania, a small community

See also

 Kissell (disambiguation)